Sergei Mirkin (born September 29, 1956) is a Russian-American biologist who studies genome instability mediated by repetitive DNA during DNA replication and transcription. He is a professor of Genetics and Molecular Biology and holds the White Family Chair in Biology at Tufts University.

Early life and education 
Mirkin was born in Moscow, Russia. He attended Moscow State University, where he earned both a Bachelor of Science and a Master of Science degree in Genetics in 1978. Mirkin went on to pursue a PhD in Molecular Biology at the Russian Academy of Sciences’ Institute of Molecular Genetics. His PhD was under the supervision of Roman B. Khesin, a molecular biologist and Mirkin later described his formative years in the Khesin lab in his essay, “Thinking of R.B. Khesin”. By studying conditionally lethal mutants of  DNA gyrase, he established a fundamental interplay between DNA supercoiling and transcription in E. coli.

Career and research
Mirkin conducted his postdoctoral studies at the Institute of Molecular Genetics with Maxim Frank-Kamenetskii, a biophysicist. This work culminated with the discovery of the three-stranded H-DNA structure. Mirkin moved to the US as a Fogarty International Fellow in 1989 and joined the faculty of the Department of Genetics at University of Illinois Chicago (UIC) in 1990. He worked at UIC until 2006 rising to the rank of Professor of Biochemistry and Molecular Genetics. In 2007, he joined Tufts University as a professor and the White Family Chair in Biology.

Mirkin’s major contributions to science include discovering of the first multi-stranded DNA structure (H-DNA); detection of dynamic non-B DNA structures, including DNA cruciforms and triplexes in vivo; establishing that structure-prone DNA repeats stall DNA replication driving their expansions that are responsible for numerous hereditary diseases in humans; and unraveling the mechanisms and consequences of transcription-replication collisions in vivo.

The Mirkin lab continues studying genome structure and function from two perspectives: the mechanisms responsible for the instability of DNA repeats implicated in human disease, the role of transcription-replication collisions in genome instability and the mechanisms of genome instability mediated at interstitial telomeric sequences.

Selected publications 
 Mirkin SM, Lyamichev VI, Drushlyak KN, Dobrynin VN, Filippov SA, Frank-Kamenetskii MD (1987) DNA H form requires a homopurine-homopyrimidine mirror repeat. Nature 330: 495-497.
 Dayn A, Malkhosyan S, Mirkin SM (1992) Transcriptionally driven cruciform formation in vivo. Nucleic Acids Res. 20: 5991-5997.
 Samadashwily GM, Dayn A, Mirkin SM (1993) Suicidal nucleotide sequences for DNA polymerization. EMBO J. 12: 4975-4983.
 Frank-Kamenetskii MD, Mirkin SM (1995) Triplex DNA structures. Annu Rev Biochem 64: 65-95.
 Cox R, Mirkin SM (1997) Characteristic enrichment of DNA repeats in different genomes. Proc Natl Acad Sci USA 94: 5237-5242.
 Samadashwily GM, Raca G, Mirkin SM (1997) Trinucleotide repeats affect DNA replication in vivo. Nature Genet 17: 298-304.
 Krasilnikova MM, Samadashwily GM, Krasilnikov AS, Mirkin SM (1998) Transcription through a simple DNA repeat blocks replication elongation. EMBO J 17: 5095-5102.
 Krasilnikova MM, Mirkin SM (2004) Replication stalling at Friedreich’s ataxia (GAA)n repeats in vivo. Mol Cell Biol 24: 2286-2295.
 Mirkin EV, Mirkin SM (2005) Mechanisms of transcription-replication collisions in bacteria. Mol Cell Biol 25: 888-895.
 Mirkin EV, Mirkin SM (2007) Replication fork stalling and natural impediments. Microbiol Mol Biol Rev 71: 13-35.
 Mirkin SM (2007) Expandable DNA Repeats and Human Disease. Nature 447: 932-940.
 Voineagu I, Narayanan V, Lobachev KS, Mirkin SM (2008) Replication stalling at unstable inverted repeats: Interplay between DNA hairpins and fork stabilizing proteins. Proc Natl Acad Sci USA 105: 9936-9941.
 Voineagu I, Surka CF, Shishkin AA, Krasilnikova MM, Mirkin SM (2009) Replisome stalling and stabilization at CGG repeats, which are responsible for chromosomal fragility. Nat Struct Mol Biol 16: 226-228.
 Shishkin AA, Voineagu I, Matera R, Cherng N, Chernet BT, Krasilnikova MM, Narayanan V, Lobachev KS, Mirkin SM (2009) Large-scale expansions of Friedreich's ataxia GAA repeats in yeast. Mol Cell 35: 82-92.
 Shah KA, Shishkin AA, Voineagu I, Pavlov YI, Shcherbakova PV, Mirkin SM (2012) Role of DNA polymerases in repeat-mediated genome instability. Cell Rep 2: 1088-1095.
 Aksenova AY, Greenwell PW, Dominska M, Shishkin AA, Kim JC, Petes TD, Mirkin SM (2013) Genome rearrangements caused by interstitial telomeric sequences in yeast. Proc Natl Acad Sci USA 110: 19866-19871.
 Kim JC, Harris ST, Dinter T, Shah KA, Mirkin SM (2017) The role of break-induced replication in large-scale expansions of (CAG)n/(CTG)n repeats. Nat Struct Mol Biol 24: 55-60.
 Neil AJ, Liang MU, Khristich AN, Shah KA, Mirkin SM (2018) RNA-DNA hybrids promote the expansion of Friedreich's ataxia (GAA)n repeats via break-induced replication. Nucleic Acids Res 46: 3487-3497.
 Kononenko AV, Ebersole T, Vasquez KM, Mirkin SM (2018) Mechanisms of genetic instability caused by (CGG)n repeats in an experimental mammalian system. Nat Struct Mol Biol 25: 669-676.
 Khristich AN, Armenia JF, Matera RM, Kolchinski AA, Mirkin SM (2020) Large-scale contractions of Friedreich's ataxia GAA repeats in yeast occur during DNA replication due to their triplex-forming ability. Proc Natl Acad Sci USA 117: 1628-1637
 Neil AJ, Hisey JA, Quasem I, McGinty RJ, Hitczenko M, Khristich AN, Mirkin SM (2021) Replication-independent instability of Friedreich's ataxia GAA repeats during chronological aging. Proc Natl Acad Sci USA 118: e2013080118.
 Matos-Rodrigues G, van Wietmarschen N, Wu W, Tripathi V, Koussa NC, Pavani R, Nathan WJ, Callen E, Belinky F, Mohammed A, Napierala M, Usdin K, Ansari AZ, Mirkin SM, Nussenzweig A. (2022) S1-END-seq reveals DNA secondary structures in human cells. Mol Cell 22: 1097-2765.
 Masnovo C, Lobo AF, Mirkin SM (2022) Replication dependent and independent mechanisms of GAA repeat instability. DNA Repair 118: e103385.

Awards and honors 
 Editor-in-Chief, Current Opinions in Genetics and Development, 2010-2013
 Distinguished Senior Scholar Award, Tufts University, 2020

References

Living people
Russian biologists
Scientists from Moscow
1956 births